Balantidiasis is a protozoan infection caused by infection with Balantidium coli.

Symptoms and signs

Usually asymptomatic in immunocompetent individuals, but the symptoms of balantidiasis include:
 Intermittent diarrhea
 Constipation
 Vomiting
 Abdominal pain
 Anorexia
 Weight loss
 Headache
 Colitis
 Marked fluid loss
The most common ones are intermittent diarrhea and constipation or inflammation of the colon combined with abdominal cramps and bloody stools.

Transmission
Balantidium is the only ciliated protozoan known to infect humans. Balantidiasis is a zoonotic disease and is acquired by humans via the feco-oral route from the normal host, the pig, where it is asymptomatic. Fecally contaminated food and water are the common sources of infection in humans.

Morphology

Balantidium coli exists in either of two developmental stages: trophozoites and cysts. In the trophozoite form, they can be oblong or spherical, and are typically 30 to 150 µm in length and 25 to 120 µm in width. It is its size at this stage that allows Balantidium coli to be characterized as the largest protozoan parasite of humans.
Trophozoites possess both a macronucleus and a micronucleus, and both are usually visible.  The macronucleus is large and sausage-shaped while the micronucleus is less prominent. At this stage, the organism is not infective but it can replicate by transverse binary fission.

In its cyst stage, the parasite takes on a smaller, more spherical shape, with a diameter of around 40 to 60 µm. Unlike the trophozoite, whose surface is covered only with cilia, the cyst form has a tough wall made of one or more layers. The cyst form also differs from the trophozoite form in being non-motile and does not undergo reproduction. The parasite must be ingested as a cyst in order to cause infection.

Diagnosis
The diagnosis of balantidiasis can be an intricate process, partly because the related symptoms may or may not all be present at once. However, the diagnosis of balantidiasis can be considered when a patient has diarrhea combined with a probable history of current exposure to pigs (as pigs are the primary reservoir), contact with infected persons, or anal sexual contact. The diagnosis of balantidiasis can be made by microscopic examination of stools in search of trophozoites or cysts, or colonoscopy or sigmoidoscopy to obtain a biopsy specimen from the large intestine, which may provide evidence for the presence of trophozoites.

Prevention

Preventative measures require effective personal and community hygiene. Some specific safeguards include the following:
 Purification of drinking water.
 Proper handling of food.
 Careful disposal of human feces.
 Monitoring the contacts of balantidiasis patients.

Treatment
Balantidiasis can be treated with tetracycline, metronidazole or iodoquinol.

History

The first study to generate balantidiasis in humans was undertaken by Cassagrandi and Barnagallo in 1896. However, this experiment was not successful in creating an infection and it was unclear whether Balantidium coli was the actual parasite used. The first case of balantidiasis in the Philippines, where it is the most common, was reported in 1904. Currently, Balantidium coli is distributed worldwide but less than 1% of the human population is infected.
Pigs are a major reservoir of the parasite, and infection of humans occurs more frequently in areas where pigs commingle with people. This includes places like the Philippines, as previously mentioned, but also includes countries such as Bolivia and Papua New Guinea. Pigs are not the sole species capable of hosting B. coli. For example, the parasite also has a high rate of occurrence in rats. In a Japanese study that analyzed the fecal samples in 56 mammalian species, Balantidium coli was found to be present not just in all the wild boars tested (with wild boars and pigs being considered the same species), it was also found in five species of non human primate: Chimpanzee (Pan troglodytes), White-handed gibbon (Hylobates lar), Squirrel monkey (Saimiri sciurea), Sacred baboon (Comopithecus hamadryas), and Japanese macaque (Macaca fuscata). In other studies, Balantidium coli has also been found in species from the order Carnivora.

References

External links 

Intestinal infectious diseases
Tropical diseases